José Pedro Ferreira Costa Leite (born 12 January 1997) known as Zé Pedro, is a Portuguese footballer who plays for Oliveirense.

Club career
On 29 July 2018, Zé Pedro made his professional debut with Feirense in a 2018–19 Taça da Liga match against Leixões.

Zé Pedro left Sporting Kansas City II on July 2, 2020, by mutual consent.

References

External links

1997 births
Living people
People from São João da Madeira
Portuguese footballers
Association football forwards
Segunda Divisão players
A.D. Sanjoanense players
F.C. Felgueiras 1932 players
C.D. Feirense players
S.C. Covilhã players
Sporting Kansas City II players
USL Championship players
Expatriate soccer players in the United States
Portuguese expatriate footballers
Portuguese expatriate sportspeople in the United States
Sportspeople from Aveiro District